This page provides summaries for the 1979 CFU Championship.

Qualifying round

First round
The following are known results only; there may be more matches.

 vs , Martinique advanced to the second round after Dominican Republic withdrew due to revolution.

Second round

Final tournament

The final stage was held in Trinidad and Tobago.

References
RSSSF archives

Caribbean Cup
CFU
1978 in Trinidad and Tobago